Jo Koy: Comin' in Hot is a 2019 Netflix stand-up comedy special by American comic Jo Koy, his second Netflix stand-up special for Netflix after Jo Koy: Live from Seattle. In Comin' in Hot, directed by Shannon Hartman in the Blaisdell Center's arena in Hawaii, Jo Koy talks about cultural differences, fatherhood and more.

Cast
 Jo Koy

Release
It was released on June 12, 2019 on Netflix streaming.

References

External links
 
 
 

2019 television specials
Netflix specials
Stand-up comedy concert films
Koy, Jo: Comin' In Hot